was a village located in Kitashitara District, Aichi Prefecture, Japan.

As of May 1, 2004, the village had an estimated population of 218 and a density of 6.3 persons per km². Its total area was 34.78 km².

Geography
Tomiyama was located at the extreme northeast corner of Aichi Prefecture, in an area of 1000-meter mountains. Some 90 percent of the village area was covered in mountains and forest.

History
Tomiyama Village was created in the early Meiji period cadastral reform of 1876. The completion of the Sakuma Dam in 1955 flooded much of the arable land in the village, forcing the resettlement of most of the inhabitants, and leaving Tomiyama with the distinction of being the least populous village in Japan (aside from some isolated islets).

On November 27, 2005, Tomiyama was merged into expanded the village of Toyone and has ceased to exist as an independent municipality.

External links
Unofficial home page

Dissolved municipalities of Aichi Prefecture
Toyone, Aichi